The Serie B of the Brazilian Championship 2017 was a football competition held in Brazil, equivalent to the second division. It was contested by 20 clubs, between 12 May and 25 November. The top four teams were promoted to Série A in 2018 and the bottom four were relegated to Série C in 2018.

América Mineiro were crowned champions.

Teams

Number of teams by state

Personnel and kits

Managerial changes

League table

Results

Top scorers

Attendances

Average home attendances

Updated for games played on 25 November 2017. Paying spectators only.

Source: Boletim Financeiro

References

Campeonato Brasileiro Série B seasons
Campeonato Brasileiro Série B